João Pedro Fernandes Pais (born 13 September 1998) is a Portuguese footballer who plays for Oliveira do Hospital on loan from Vizela as a midfieler.

Football career
He made his professional debut for Vizela on 12 September 2020 in the Liga Portugal 2.

On 20 September 2021, he joined Oliveira do Hospital on loan.

References

External links

1998 births
Living people
Sportspeople from Coimbra
Portuguese footballers
Association football midfielders
Liga Portugal 2 players
Campeonato de Portugal (league) players
F.C. Vizela players
Juventude de Pedras Salgadas players
F.C. Oliveira do Hospital players